Emanuel Rivers is a physician born and raised in River Rouge, Michigan which is a suburb of  Detroit, MI. He is board certified in emergency medicine, internal medicine and critical care medicine. Rivers has published extensive work in the field of shock, sepsis and resuscitation.

Education and career
Emanuel Rivers is Vice Chairman and Director of Research for the Department of Emergency Medicine. He is a Senior Staff Attending Physician in the Surgical Critical Care Unit and the Emergency Department at Henry Ford Hospital in Detroit, Michigan.

He received his Bachelor of Science, Master of Public Health, and Doctorate in Medicine from the University of Michigan in Ann Arbor, Michigan. He completed a residency in emergency and internal medicine at Henry Ford Hospital, Detroit, Michigan, followed by a fellowship in critical care medicine at the University of Pittsburgh, PA. He is Board certified in Critical Care Medicine, Emergency Medicine and Internal Medicine. He also has a special competency in Hyperbaric Medicine.

Rivers is a national or international research award recipient from the Society of Academic Emergency Medicine (2010), American College of Emergency Physicians (2005), Society of Academic Emergency Medicine (2000), American College of Chest Physicians (2000), Society of Critical Care Medicine and European Society of Critical Care Medicine Research Award (2000). 
He is a fellow of the American Academy of Emergency Medicine, American College of Chest Physicians and long standing member of the Society of Critical Care Medicine.

He was the first physician in the history of Henry Ford Hospital to be inducted into the Institute of Medicine, National Academy of Sciences in 2005 and has been called to serve on task forces to advise the United States government on health care issues. He was voted one of the Top Docs in the city of Detroit for the years 2006 to 2010.  He is also a quality consultant to 3 of the top ten health care delivery systems in the United States. Rivers' practice and research are based out of the Henry Ford Hospital in Detroit, MI.

Rivers' interests include the examination and treatment of critical illness or the critically ill in the earliest stages of hospital presentation, which includes the Emergency Department and Intensive Care Unit.  Diseases, which are included in this area, are patients presenting with shock of all kinds (septic or severe infection, trauma or hemorrhage, heart attacks, blood clots to the lung and other shock states such as cardiac arrest).  He is examining new ways to improve upon early detection and aggressive treatment of these diseases, which cost many lives and consume tremendous health care resources.  He is further interested in evaluating the number of patients who can be saved at this stage and how well we are treating these patients as well as the epidemiology and outcome evaluation of early critical illness.

Contributions
The algorithm of emergent resuscitation in the setting of severe sepsis and/or septic shock has been formally conceptualized by Emanuel Rivers in a landmark paper in November 2001  using early goal directed therapy (EGDT) in the emergency department. EGDT has been used and validated for years in the intensive care unit, but Rivers's paper expanded the idea to incorporate all those initially presenting to the ED with signs of severe sepsis or septic shock. Many hospitals across the United States such as Kaiser and Catholic Health Care West have rapidly incorporated the protocol developed by Rivers in their ED treatment algorithms, as well as use it as a quality improvement data point. EGDT has also been cited by the Joint Commission of Hospital Accreditation as a quality improvement initiative for the last two years.

Discussion
The EGDT study is a reflection of expert opinion for sepsis management by the American College of Critical Care Medicine. His Early Goal Directed Therapy recommendations have been replicated in over 33 publications since 2001 comprising over 8,000 patients with equal efficacy and improvement in health care costs. Three recent multi center trials (ProCESS investigators, ARISE investigators, and ProMISe investigators) published in the New England Journal of Medicine compared EGDT versus other protocol-directed care versus standard care. There was no significant difference in the primary outcome of mortality. However, the authors of these trials conclude that this is because Rivers' 2001 study was so well known that it improved the level of standard care such that it is similar to EGDT. Evidence-based medicine experts have argued that these three trials reaffirm the principles of early recognition of sepsis, early broad-spectrum antibiotic use and intravenous fluid resuscitation. The invasive monitoring involved in EGDT is probably unnecessary.

In 2014 the ProCESS study was published. Process enrolled 1,341 patients, of whom 439 were randomly assigned to protocol-based EGDT (Rivers EGDT), 446 to protocol-based standard therapy, and 456 to usual care. There was no significant difference in 90-day and 1-year mortality between groups. However, in the sickest sub-group of patients (those with a baseline lactate >5.3 mmol/L) the mortality was significantly higher in the EGDT group as compared to usual care (38.2 vs. 26.4; p = 0.05). ProCESS has now clearly established that EGDT should be abandoned.

References

American emergency physicians
Living people
University of Michigan Medical School alumni
Year of birth missing (living people)
Members of the National Academy of Medicine